Jan (Cesar Jan) Adriaensens (born 6 June 1932 in Willebroek) was a Belgian road bicycle racer. He finished twice on the podium of the Tour de France, with a third place in 1956 and in 1960. In both these years, he wore the yellow jersey as the leader of the general classification.

Major victories 

1955
 1st in Tour of Morocco
1956
 1st stage Four Days of Dunkirk
 4th stage Four Days of Dunkirk
 Winner Four Days of Dunkirk
1957
 3rd stage Paris–Nice
 7th stage Vuelta a España
1958
 Tour du Tessin
1961
 Flèche Hesbignonne Evernijs (Cras Avernas)

Major endings 

1955
 5th in de La Flèche Wallonne
 5th in Liège–Bastogne–Liège
1956
 3rd in the Tour de France
1957
 3rd in Paris–Brussels
1958
 4th in the Tour de France
1959
 2nd place in the Belgian national championship
1960
 3rd in the Tour de France

Tour de France results
1953 – 45th
1955 – 28th
1956 – 3rd, wearing yellow jersey for three days
1957 – 9th
1958 – 4th
1959 – 7th
1960 – 3rd, wearing yellow jersey for four days
1961 – 10th

References

External links
Palmares 

Belgian male cyclists
Belgian Vuelta a España stage winners
2018 deaths
1932 births
People from Willebroek
Cyclists from Antwerp Province
20th-century Belgian people